"Not Your Fault" is a song by American alternative rock band Awolnation. It was written by frontman Aaron Bruno and recorded by the band for their debut studio album Megalithic Symphony, where it appears as the twelfth track. "Not Your Fault" was released to American modern rock radio on October 17, 2011, and was also released as a single in the United Kingdom and Bosnia on February 26, 2012. The single peaked at numbers three and eleven on the US Billboard Alternative Songs and Rock Songs charts, respectively.

Music video
The music video for "Not Your Fault" utilizes pixilation, clay animation and stop motion, similar to Peter Gabriel's "Sledgehammer" and the animation style of Dino Stamatopoulos. In the video, frontman Aaron Bruno is shown singing the song as he and his band—in clay animation style—trying to defeat monsters. Bruno is also shown attracting a girl and saving her in the process. A 3D version of the music video was also featured in the Nintendo 3DS video service Nintendo Video.

Track listing

Personnel
 Aaron Bruno – lead vocals, rhythm guitar
 Christopher Thorn – lead guitar
 Kenny Carkeet – keyboards, backing vocals, rhythm guitar 
 Hayden Scott – drums
 David Amezcua – bass guitar, backing vocals

Charts

Weekly charts

Year-end charts

Certifications

Release history

References

Awolnation songs
2011 songs
2011 singles
Songs written by Aaron Bruno
Red Bull Records singles